Jeffrey's is a village located south west of Stephenville on the west coast of the island of Newfoundland, Canada. It had a population of 260 in 1951.

See also
 List of communities in Newfoundland and Labrador

Populated places in Newfoundland and Labrador